Alisha Gaddis is an American, Grammy-nominated, multiple Latin Grammy-winning, Emmy-winning recording artist, actress, producer, director and writer.  She is a founding member of Lucky Diaz and The Family Jam Band with her husband Lucky Diaz, and known for her Emmy-winning role as Lishy Lou on the PBS show Lishy Lou and Lucky Too. Gaddis was inducted into the EVSC Hall of Fame as part of the class of 2022. She is a graduate of NYU Tish School of the Arts.

Awards 
As a member of Lucky Diaz and the Family Jam Band, Alisha Gaddis won a 2013 Latin GRAMMY Award for Best Latin Children's Album for ¡Fantastico! making Gaddis and her husband Lucky Diaz the first Americans to win a Latin GRAMMY.  The album Adelante was a 16th Annual Latin GRAMMY Awards nominee.  In 2019, the band won their second Latin Grammy Award for the album Buenos Diaz under the name The Lucky Band. The album Paseo Lunar was nominated for a 2020 Latin Grammy Award in the Children's category making this the fourth nomination for The Lucky Band.

The albums Crayon Kids (2021) and Los Fabulosos (2022) were nominated in the Best Children's Album category for the 64th Grammy Awards and 65th Grammy Awards respectively.

The band was the recipient of the Parent's Choice Gold Award from the Parent's Choice Foundation which rewards excellence in children's entertainment, for Oh Lucky Day (2011).

Gaddis won an Emmy Award in 2015 for Best Performer, as part of their bilingual children's TV show Lishy Lou and Lucky Too as part of Friday Zone on PBS.

Discography 
Albums with Lucky Diaz and The Family Jam Band as vocalist and producer.

 Luckiest Adventure (April 2010) CD Only
 Oh Lucky Day (April 2011)
 A Potluck (May 2012)
 ¡Fantastico! (May 2013) - Best Latin Children's Album GRAMMY Winner, 2013
 Lishy Lou and Lucky Too (October 2013)
 Aquí, Allá (May 2014)
 Adelante (May 2015) - Best Latin Children's Album GRAMMY Nominee, 2015
 Greatest Hits Vol 1 (July 2016)
 Made in LA (July 2017)
 Hold Tight, Shine Bright (August 2018)
 Buenos Diaz (April 2019)
 Paseo Lunar (May 2020)
 Crayon Kids (June 2021)
 Los Fabulosos (April 2022)

Books 
As an author, Alisha Gaddis has released books She Loves Me All The Same (2019), Mama's Milk and Me: A Journal for Nursing Mothers (Breastfeeding, Childcare, Motherhood, Weaning) (2020), Your House Keys Are in the Dryer: A Parenting Haiku Book (2022), Periods, Period. (2023) on Post Hill Press Also a book series on Heuer Publishing including titles, Kids' Comedic Monologues That Are Actually Funny, LGBTQ Comedic Monologues That Are Actually Funny, Men's Comedic Monologues That Are Actually Funny, Teen Boys' Comedic Monologues That Are Actually Funny, Teen Girls' Comedic Monologues That Are Actually Funny, Women's Comedic Monologues That Are Actually Funny.

Personal life 
Alisha Gaddis met her husband Lucky Diaz at The Comedy Store in Los Angeles, California. They married in 2012 and are raising two children together.

Gaddis was listed as Best Dressed for multiple press outlets at both the 2022 and 2023 Grammy Awards.

References